Ali Dawai Lazem is the current Governor of Maysan Province. Dawai's popularity took off after images posted to Facebook showing him working in the streets and directing projects went viral. Dawai is the only Governor belonging to the Sadrist movement.

References

Living people
1965 births
Governors of Maysan Governorate
University of Baghdad alumni
People from Amarah
Sadrist Movement politicians
Iraqi Shia Muslims